Events from the year 1814 in Ireland.

Events
1 February – Royal Belfast Academical Institution opened as a school and college.
18 June – improved navigation of River Shannon between Limerick and Killaloe opens.
25 December – inauguration of Chapel Royal, Dublin, designed by Francis Johnston.
Apprentice Boys of Derry Club formed (although the siege of Derry has been celebrated from the 17th century).
William Shaw Mason's A Statistical Account or Parochial Survey of Ireland, drawn up from the communications of the clergy begins publication in Dublin.

Arts and literature
27 May – Harriet Smithson makes her stage debut at the Crow Street Theatre, Dublin, as Albina Mandeville in Frederick Reynolds's The Will.
Sydney, Lady Morgan, publishes her novel O'Donnell.

Births
10 January – Aubrey Thomas de Vere, poet and critic (died 1902).
9 May – John Brougham, actor and dramatist (died 1880).
18 August – David Moriarty, Roman Catholic Bishop of Kerry (died 1877).
28 August – Sheridan Le Fanu, writer (died 1873).
3 September – Richard Graves MacDonnell, lawyer, judge and colonial governor (died 1881).
14 October – Thomas Osborne Davis, lawyer and writer, author of the song "A Nation Once Again" (died 1845).
3 December – William Fitzgerald, Church of Ireland Bishop of Killaloe (died 1883).
Full date unknown
Daniel Devlin, businessman and City Chamberlain in New York (died 1867).
John Lalor, journalist and author (died 1856).
Mary O'Connell, nurse during the American Civil War (died 1897).
Charles O'Hea, Catholic Priest, baptised Ned Kelly and ministered to him before he was hanged in 1880 (died 1903).
John Purcell, soldier, recipient of the Victoria Cross for gallantry in 1857 at Delhi, India, later killed in action (died 1857).

Deaths
8 May (suicide) – William Nelson Gardiner, eccentric engraver and bookseller (born 1766).
17 June – Henry Tresham, historical painter (born c.1751).
9 July – Daniel Delany, Bishop of Kildare and Leighton, founder of two Catholic religious congregations and St Patrick's College, Carlow.
10 August – George Ogle, politician (born 1742).
21 November – Juan Mackenna, soldier of fortune (born 1771).
9 December – Arturo O'Neill, soldier of fortune (born 1736).
20 December – Robert Uniacke Fitzgerald, lawyer, soldier and politician (born 1751).
Geoffrey Font, centenarian (born 1709).

References

 
Years of the 19th century in Ireland
1810s in Ireland
Ireland
 Ireland